The di-π-methane rearrangement is a photochemical reaction of a molecular entity that contains two π-systems separated by a saturated carbon atom (a 1,4-diene or an allyl-substituted aromatic ring), to form an ene- (or aryl-) substituted cyclopropane. The rearrangement reaction formally amounts to a 1,2 shift of one ene group (in the diene) or the aryl group (in the allyl-aromatic analog) and bond formation between the lateral carbons of the non-migrating moiety.

Discovery and mechanism
This rearrangement was originally encountered in the photolysis of barrelene to give semibullvalene. Once the mechanism was recognized as general by Howard Zimmerman in 1967, it was clear that the structural requirement was having two pi groups attached to an sp3-hybridized carbon, and then a variety of further examples was obtained. One was the photolysis of the Mariano Compound, 3,3-dimethyl-1,1,5,5-tetraphenyl-1,4-pentadiene. Another was the reaction of the Pratt diene 

Equation 1. The mechanism of the Mariano diene rearranging

In contrast, in the case of the Pratt diene rearranging, there are two possible regiochemistries - a and b. Process a is preferred since it leaves benzhydryl odd-electron stabilization intact.

Equation 2. The mechanism of the Pratt diene rearranging; note the regioselectivity

The barrelene rearrangement is now presented. It is a bit more complex than the Mariano and Pratt examples since there are two sp3-hybridized (i.e. methane) carbons. Each such bridgehead carbon has three (ethylenic) pi bonds while two are needed for the di-π-methane rearrangement. Another difference is that the barrelene reaction requires the triplet excited state while the Mariano and Pratt acyclic dienes used the excited singlet. Thus acetone is used in the barrelene reaction; acetone captures the light and then delivers triplet excitation to the barrelene reactant. In the final step of the rearrangement there is a spin-flip, termed intersystem-crossing (ISC) to provide paired electrons and a new sigma bond.

Equation 3. The mechanism of the Barrelene to Semibullvalene transformation

The dependence of the success of the di-π-methane rearrangement on singlet versus triplet multiplicity arises primarily from the Free-Rotor Effect  The triplet acyclic 1,4-dienes are free to undergo cis-trans interconversion of the diene double bonds (i.e. free-rotation) thus inhibiting the di-π-methane process. The cis-trans isomerization proceeds by weakening of a pi-bond and then twisting. The singlet excited states don't rotate and then are free to undergo the di-π-methane mechanism.
For cyclic dienes, as in the barrelene example, the ring structure prevents cis-trans isomerization and the di-π-methane can then occur.

References

Rearrangement reactions